Shams Al-Ma'arif is a 2020 Saudi comedy film directed by Faris Godus. It premiered on July 22, 2020, in Jeddah, then in Riyadh. It was widely released in Saudi Arabia on July 31, 2020. The film was supposed to premiere in the Red Sea International Film Festival but it got delayed due to the Coronavirus pandemic.

Shams Al-Ma'arif tells the story of a group of Saudi teens and how the internet and content making changed their lives. It gives an insider's look at the origins of Saudi content making from the nineties to the current times. The story also has a personal nature as the Godus brothers started making content on YouTube before their debut.

Plot 
In 2010, a student called Husam is about to graduate high school but he becomes obsessed with making content at the peak of Saudi YouTube content. That leads him to an adventure to explore his passion. He is making a low-budget horror movie during his senior year with the help of his best friend Maan, his rival Ibrahim, and their physics teacher Orabi.

Cast 
 Sohayb Godus
 Baraa Alem
 Ismail Alhassan
 Ahmed Saddam
 Nawaf Alshubaili
 Eyad Ayman Kaifi

Name 
Shams Al-Ma'arif refers to the infamous book Shams al-Ma'arif wa Lata'if al-'Awarif, a 13th century magic and spirituality manual. It has been banned in most islamic countries and its name became synonymous with the occult.

Reception 
The movie has been well received in the Arab cinema community. The Red Sea Film Festival Director Mahmoud Sabbagh said: "The Godus brothers have created a testament to the passionate community of pioneering filmmakers, who have inspired and drive Saudi cinema culture." Arab News praised the movie and its message saying: "The film perfectly encapsulates the complex feelings of an entire generation of Saudi youth, who struggled before the current era to imagine a future when creative professions could ever be taken seriously." KAWA regarded it as "A personal and universal film at the same time".

References 

2020 films
2020 comedy films
Saudi Arabian comedy films